Primula heucherifolia is a species of flowering plant in the family Primulaceae.

Description 
Primula heucherifolia is a stoloniferous species with creeping rhizomes. Stems sprout from the base of the plant and are 1530 cm in height. Plants bloom between May and June. Each stem can possess three to ten nodding flowers.  Flowers can range from a lilac-mauve to a deep purple in colour. The leaves are sparsely hairy and possess an orbicular blade. Leaves range in length from 615 cm and width by 36 cm.

Distribution and habitat 
Primula heucherifolia is native to South-central China, where it can be found on the western side of the Sichuan province. It has been recorded growing at ranges of 2000–3200 metres above sea level. P. heucherifolia grows in shaded, cool and damp habitats. It is often found growing under the shelter of rocks, cliffs, trees and grasses. It can also be found growing within bamboo forests.

References 

heucherifolia
Flora of China
Flora of Sichuan